John Q. Radcliffe (1920 – 2001) was a member of the Wisconsin State Assembly.

Biography
Radcliffe was born on May 19, 1920, in Little Falls, Wisconsin. He had an eighth grade education. During World War II, he served in the United States Navy aboard the USS Atherton. Radcliffe died on August 19, 2001, and is buried in Unity, Trempealeau County, Wisconsin.

Political career
Radcliffe was elected to the Assembly in 1964. Previously, he was Chairman of the Trempealeau County, Wisconsin Democratic Party from 1961 to 1962. He remained a member of the Assembly until he resigned on January 19, 1971, to become the state's Highway Safety Coordinator.

References

People from Monroe County, Wisconsin
People from Rusk County, Wisconsin
People from Trempealeau County, Wisconsin
Democratic Party members of the Wisconsin State Assembly
Military personnel from Wisconsin
United States Navy sailors
United States Navy personnel of World War II
1920 births
2001 deaths
20th-century American politicians